Brennand Airport,  is a privately owned public use airport located  southwest of the central business district of Neenah, a city in Winnebago County, Wisconsin, United States about halfway between Appleton and Oshkosh. The airport is home to EAA Chapter 41.

Although most airports in the United States use the same three-letter location identifier for the FAA and International Air Transport Association (IATA), this airport is assigned 79C by the FAA but has no designation from the IATA.

Facilities and aircraft 
It has one asphalt runway: 18/36 is 2,450 by 20 feet (747 x 6 m).

For the 12-month period ending August 10, 2020, the airport had 14,550 aircraft operations, an average of 40 per day; greater than 99% general aviation and less than 1% air taxi. In January 2023, there were 33 aircraft based at this airport: 30 single-engine, 1 helicopter and 2 ultralight.

See also
 List of airports in Wisconsin

References

External links 
 

Airports in Wisconsin
Buildings and structures in Winnebago County, Wisconsin
Transportation in Winnebago County, Wisconsin